Tarpon is an unincorporated community in Dickenson County, Virginia, in the United States.

History
Tarpon contained a post office from 1876 until 1961. Pine tar on a nearby pond gave the community its name.

References

Unincorporated communities in Dickenson County, Virginia
Unincorporated communities in Virginia